Pterostylis stricta, commonly known as the northern greenhood, is a species of orchid endemic to Queensland. It has a rosette of leaves and when flowering a single translucent white flower with green lines, a reddish-brown tip and a curved, protruding labellum.

Description
Pterostylis stricta is a terrestrial, perennial, deciduous, herb with an underground tuber and a rosette of wrinkled leaves. The dorsal sepal and petals are fused to form a hood or "galea" over the column, the dorsal sepal about the same length as the petals, all with a sharp point. There is a wide gap at each side of the flower between the petals and lateral sepals. Flowering occurs from March to July.

Taxonomy and naming
Pterostylis stricta was first described in 1972 by  Stephen Clemesha and Bruce Gray and the description was published in The Orchadian from a specimen collected near Ravenshoe. The specific epithet (stricta) is a Latin word meaning "draw together", "hold in check" or "bind".

Distribution and habitat

References

stricta
Orchids of Queensland
Plants described in 1972